Chen Qiufa (born December 1954) is a Chinese aerospace engineer and politician of Miao ethnic heritage. He is the Communist Party Secretary and the former Governor of Liaoning province. He formerly served as Director of the China Atomic Energy Authority, Director of the China National Space Administration (CNSA), and Vice-Minister of Industry and Information Technology.

Early life and education
Chen Qiufa was born in December 1954 in Chengdu County (now Chengbu Miao Autonomous County), Hunan Province. He is a member of the Miao minority. He began working in March 1973 as a teacher at Lianxing Elementary School in Chengbu, and joined the Communist Party of China in September 1974.

In September 1975, Chen entered the electrical engineering department of National University of Defense Technology in Changsha, majoring in radar countermeasure. He graduated in October 1978.

Career
After university Chen worked for the Ministry of Aerospace Industry from 1978 to 1994, first as an engineer, and later as a manager. From 1994 to 1998 he worked for China Aerospace Science and Technology Corporation. From 1998 to 2000 he was Director of the education department of the Commission for Science, Technology and Industry for National Defense (COSTIND). He was Head of Commission for Discipline Inspection at COSTIND from 2000 to 2005.

From 2005 to 2008 he was deputy director of COSTIND. When COSTIND was reorganized and merged into the Ministry of Industry and Information Technology (MIIT) in 2008, he became Director of the State Administration for Science, Technology and Industry for National Defence (SASTIND) under MIIT, as well as Vice-Minister of MIIT. He was also appointed Director of the China Atomic Energy Authority in 2008 and Director of the China National Space Administration in 2010.

In January 2013, he left all his positions with MIIT and was tapped to become Chairman of the Chinese People's Political Consultative Conference (PPCC) of his native Hunan Province, taking on a political office for the first time. He was also elected in November 2012 as a full member of the 18th Central Committee of the Communist Party of China.

On May 4, 2015, Chen Qiufa was appointed Acting Governor and Deputy Party Secretary of Liaoning province, succeeding Li Xi, who was promoted to Party Secretary. Along with Ma Xingrui and Zhang Qingwei, Chen was one of a growing number of high regional officials in his generation who rose through the aerospace industry.  Chen's appointment to Liaoning also demonstrated that being a provincial-level PPCC chief was no longer considered a "political retirement home" for older politicians, and that holders of this office could still be considered for further promotion. He was appointed as the Party Secretary of Liaoning in 2017. He was replaced by Zhang Guoqing in 2020.

On 17 October 2020, Chen was appointed as the Deputy Chairperson of the National People's Congress Education, Science, Culture and Public Health Committee.

References

Living people
1954 births
Chinese Communist Party politicians from Hunan
People's Republic of China politicians from Hunan
Governors of Liaoning
Miao people
Scientists from Hunan
Politicians from Shaoyang
Chinese aerospace engineers
National University of Defense Technology alumni
Political office-holders in Hunan
China National Space Administration people
Delegates to the 12th National People's Congress
Members of the 19th Central Committee of the Chinese Communist Party
Members of the 18th Central Committee of the Chinese Communist Party
Members of the 12th Chinese People's Political Consultative Conference
Engineers from Hunan